Emilie Linder (Oct. 11, 1797 – Feb. 12, 1867) was a Swiss painter and art patron.

Early life 
Linder was born in Basel, Switzerland in 1797. She was the daughter of painter Franz Lukas Linder and Anna Maria Dienast; the Linders were an established family of textile manufacturers in Basel. Orphaned by age fifteen, her grandfather Johann Konrad Dienast-Burckhardt took her in and encouraged her talent for art.

Education and Career 
In 1824, Linder moved to Munich for artistic education. While she visited the Academy of Fine Arts in Munich, because she was a woman, she could not attend the academy herself. Her primary teacher was history painter Joseph Schlotthauer.

Her family friend Johann Nepomuk von Ringseis introduced Linder to many of the artists active in Munich. She was wooed by Franz Xaver von Baader and Clemens Brentano, but did not marry either of them.

She traveled to northern and central Italy in 1825 with Schlotthauer and his wife. Between 1828 and 1831, Linder lived in Rome and studied Italian paintings. While in Italy, Linder befriended Johann Friedrich Overbeck, leader of the Nazarene movement of German Romantic Christian painters.

In 1832, Linder settled permanently in Munich. She became well-known as a painter and as an intellectual hostess of salons.

Paintings 
Linder mostly painted anonymous devotional pictures and altarpieces, which she gave to destitute churches. Though she was known for her paintings during her lifetime, her habit of not signing her paintings has concealed her impact in German religious painting. She also painted portraits of friends and nobility.

Her 1835 portrait of Brentano is widely used, though it is often uncredited. Today, it is in the Munich Stadtmuseum.

Conversion 
Linder converted to Catholicism in 1843. Her artwork became entirely religious.

Art Collection 
Linder used her wealth to collect and commission paintings by the Nazarenes and other, lesser-known painters. She commissioned Schlotthauer to travel to Italy to copy Leonardo da Vinci's Last Supper in 1834.

Cultural impact 

Linder was one of Brentano's main correspondents during his religious seclusion.

Franz von Baader dedicated his "Forty Sentences from a Religious Erotic" to her in 1831. In 1860, Ernst von Lasaulx dedicated his “Philosophy of Fine Arts" to her.

Legacy 
In 1847, Linder donated her entire art collection, including many important Nazarene paintings, to the public art gallery in Basel. Today, her works are in the Kunstmuseum Basel.

Further reading 

 Bischoff, Teresa and Karl Möseneder. Kunst Und Caritas: Leben Und Werk Der Kunstsammlerin, Mäzenin Und Malerin Emilie Linder. Schriftenreihe Des Erlanger Instituts Für Kunstgeschichte; Bd. 2. Petersberg: Imhof, 2014. (in German)
 Braun, Patrick, and Axel Christoph Gampp. Emilie Linder, 1797-1867: Malerin, Mäzenin, Kunstsammlerin. Beiträge Zur Basler Geschichte. Basel: Christoph Merian, 2013. (in German)
 Meier, Nikolaus. Stiften Und Sammeln Für Die Öffentliche Kunstsammlung Basel: Emilie Linder, Jacob Burckhardt Und Das Kunstleben Der Stadt Basel. Basel: Schwabe, 1997. (in German)
 Jent, Verena. Emilie Linder, 1797-1867: Studien zur Biographie der Basler Kunstsammlerin und Freundin Clemens Brentanos, 1970. Dissertation. (in German)
 Lehner, Philomena. Emilie Linder Und Ihr Freundeskreis, 1935. Dissertation. (in German)

References 

Swiss women artists
Swiss Roman Catholics
1797 births
1867 deaths
Converts to Roman Catholicism
People from Basel-Stadt
Religious painters